The women's 1000 metres competition in short track speed skating at the 2022 Winter Olympics was held on 9 February (heats) and 11 February (finals), at the Capital Indoor Stadium in Beijing. Suzanne Schulting of the Netherlands won the gold medal and thereby successfully defended her 2018 title. In the semifinal, Schulting set the new world record. Choi Min-jeong won the silver medal, and Hanne Desmet of Belgium the bronze. Desmet's medal was the first ever Belgian medal in short track speed skating and only the seventh Belgian medal at the Winter Olympics.

The 2018 silver medalist, Kim Boutin, and the bronze medalist, Arianna Fontana, qualified as well. Schulting was the 2021 World Short Track Speed Skating champion at all distances, including 1500 m. Desmet and Courtney Sarault were the silver and bronze medalists, respectively. Many top athletes did not participate in the championship, however. Schulting was also leading the 2021–22 ISU Short Track Speed Skating World Cup at the 1000 m distance with four races completed before the Olympics, followed by Kristen Santos and Choi Min-jeong.

Qualification

Countries were assigned quotas based on their performance during the 2021–22 ISU Short Track Speed Skating World Cup, with the top 32 athletes (maximum of three per country qualifying quotas. If a NOC declined a quota spot, it was distributed to the next available athlete, only if the maximum quota of 56 athletes per gender was not surpassed.

Records
Prior to this competition, the existing world and Olympic records were as follows.

The following records were set during the competition.

Results

Heats

Quarterfinals

Semifinals

Finals

Final B

Final A

References

Women's short track speed skating at the 2022 Winter Olympics